Sun City Girls is the eponymously titled debut studio album of American experimental rock band Sun City Girls, released in 1984 by Placebo Records.

Track listing

Personnel
Adapted from the Sun City Girls liner notes.

Sun City Girls
 Alan Bishop – bass guitar, guitar, alto saxophone, trumpet, dulcimer, tape, percussion, vocals
 Richard Bishop – lap steel guitar, piano, organ, melodica, flute, percussion
 Charles Gocher – drums, horns, guitar, percussion, bongos, güiro, bells, triangle, whistle, xylophone, vocals

Production and additional personnel
 Tom Barnes – engineering
 The Cat – production
 Greg Hynes – production
 Sandy Lamont – engineering
 M.A.C. – cover art
 Sun City Girls – mixing
 Tony Victor – production
 Jeff Wetherby – engineering

Release history

References 

1984 debut albums
Sun City Girls albums